Vijay Namdevrao Wadettiwar is an Indian politician and Cabinet Minister in the Government of Maharashtra in India. He is one of the most influential leaders of Indian National Congress Maharashtra with strong public support from his homeground in Naxalite infected area of Chandrapur and Gadchiroli. Vijay Wadettiwar is the most trustworthy OBC VJNT leader in Maharashtra.

Political career
The Congress has rewarded Vijay Wadettiwar by nominating him as the lower house leader last week. Following the resignation of Radhakrishna Vikhe Patil, who moved to the BJP and was immediately awarded a ministerial vacancy in Devendra Fadnavis' cabinet, the job of leader of the opposition, which carries ministerial rank, became vacant.

District level 
 1980-1981: Started political career as a grass root level worker with NSUI
 1991-1993: Z.P. Counselor of Zilla Parishad, Gadchiroli
 2010-2011: Chairman District Central Co-Operative Bank, Chandrapur

MLC 

 1998-2004: MLC from Gadchiroli for Shivsena

Minister of state India 

 2008-2009: Minister of State for Irrigation, Tribal Welfare, Environment and Forest, in the Minister of Council headed by Ashok Chavan
 2009-2010: Re-elected as M.L.A. from Chimur, constituency with a margin of 30,500 votes
 2009-2010 Nov.: Minister of State for Irrigation, Energy, Finance & Planning Parliamentary Affairs, in the Ministry headed by Ashokrao Chavan

Maharashtra

 1996-1998: Chairman of Forest Development Corporation of Maharashtra (Undertaking)
 2008-2011: Director of Maharashtra State Co-Operative Bank, Ltd. Bihar, Maharashtra

LoP 
  Leader of the Opposition Legislative Assembly Maharashtra.

Legislative 

 2004-2006: Member of Legislative Assembly Maharashtra (M.L.A.) from Chimur constituency for Shivsena
2006-2009: Member of Legislative Assembly Maharashtra (M.L.A.) from Chimur constituency for Congress (By-election after he leaves shivsena)
 2009-2014:Member of Legislative Assembly Maharashtra (M.L.A.) from Chimur constituency for Congress 
 2014–2019: Elected as M.L.A. from Congress (I) 73-Bramhapuri constituency by 15,000 votes. Bramhapuri constituency had BJP and Independent MLA since 1980 to 2014 (34 years)
2019- Member of Legislative Assembly Maharashtra (M.L.A.) 73-Bramhapuri constituency Maharashtra.

References

External links
 http://vijaywadettiwar.in
 Congress MLA Jan Akrosh Rally In Chandrapur
 Huge turnout at congress rally in Chandrapur

Marathi politicians
Living people
Maharashtra MLAs 2004–2009
Maharashtra MLAs 2009–2014
Maharashtra MLAs 2014–2019
Year of birth missing (living people)
Shiv Sena politicians
Indian National Congress politicians